Major Hon Philip Plantagenet Cary, FSA (24 September 1895 – 21 June 1968) was an officer of arms 1913-1932. He was Bluemantle Pursuivant 1919-1923 and  York Herald 1923-1932. He was the third son of Byron Cary, 12th Viscount Falkland.

He married 20 March 1920 Esther Mildred Leon (born 16 December 1899), only daughter of Sir George Edward Leon, 2nd Bt., by his first wife Mildred Ethel Jennings, daughter of Louis John Jennings MP, and had issue.

Educated Eton College. Fought in the First World War. Major, Grenadier Guards.

References

|-

|-

English officers of arms
British Army personnel of World War I
British Army personnel of World War II
Grenadier Guards officers
Younger sons of viscounts
1895 births
1968 deaths